Robert Edward Trefusis (24 January 18439 July 1930) was the first suffragan Bishop of Crediton from 1897 to 1930.

Origins
Trefusis was born in Bideford in 1843, the second son of George Trefusis (1793–1849), a younger son of Robert Trefusis, 17th Baron Clinton (1764–1797).

Career
Trefusis was educated at Cheltenham College and Exeter College, Oxford. Ordained in 1866, he began his ordained ministry as a curate in Buckingham. He was then appointed by his cousin Mark Rolle, Lord of the Manor and patron of the living, as Vicar of Chittlehampton. The parish church of Chittlehampton was dedicated to the little-known St Urith, believed to have been a local Saxon maiden born and martyred within the parish, and Trefusis named one of his daughters Hyeritha Trefusis in her honour. She became known to local parishioners as "Miss Urith".
He subsequently served for 33 years as  Bishop suffragan of Crediton; he was also additionally Archdeacon of Barnstaple from 1909. He was consecrated a bishop on St Matthias' Day (24 February 1897), by Frederick Temple, Archbishop of Canterbury, at St Paul's Cathedral. He died on 9 July 1930.

He celebrated the dedication of the Exeter War Memorial.

References

1843 births
People educated at Cheltenham College
Alumni of Exeter College, Oxford
People from Bideford
Bishops of Crediton
19th-century Church of England bishops
20th-century Church of England bishops
Archdeacons of Barnstaple
1930 deaths